Bargain Buys is a chain of discount stores operating across the United Kingdom, a subsidiary of Poundstretcher. The chain was launched in 2013 by Chris Edwards Sr. and Chris Edwards Jr., to be a subsidiary of the single-price chain they founded, Poundworld. In 2015, TPG Capital purchased a majority stake in Poundworld and Bargain Buys. TPG Capital went into administration in 2018, with all Poundworld and Bargain Buys stores closed.

Later in 2018, Poundstretcher trademarked and began opening new stores nationwide under the Bargain Buys name. A legal dispute between Poundstretcher and businessman Manni Hussain (who purchased the Poundworld assets) began over the 'Bargain Buys' trademark, Poundstretcher won the suit as the Bargain Buys name had not been previously trademarked by Poundworld. The company headquarters are currently based in Kirby Muxloe, Leicester

History

Poundworld subsidiary (2013-2018) 

Bargain Buys' first store was opened in Walsall in November 2013. Edwards and Edwards launched the multi-price chain to complement their single-price chain. Bargain Buys was the result of rebranding existing Discount UK (Discount NI in Northern Ireland) stores, initially launched in 2010. The name and branding was changed to allow the chain to compete more closely with its rivals in the market, and to exploit the expanded product range and knowledge that the business had built up.

The stores were invented to rival the likes of popular discount retailers such as Home Bargains, B&M Bargains and Poundstretcher.

As of 2015, the chain had 41 stores across the United Kingdom . The company intended to expand rapidly, with plans to double the number of stores by 2016, and to open an additional 100 stores by 2018. In April 2015 it launched an online store in a bid to expand its customer base.

The chain stocked over 8,000 products over 25 departments, this included groceries, home living and cleaning to toys, electricals and pet care. It sold leading household brands including Coca-Cola, L'Oréal, Fairy and Gillette.

On 15 May 2015 the Edwards family announced that they had sold a majority stake in both Poundworld and Bargain Buys business to US private equity firm TPG for £150 million.

On 11 June 2018, TPG announced that the Poundworld and Bargain Buys stores had appointed administrators after talks to sell the company fell through.

At some point during or after June 2018, the official website was shut, and the Facebook and Twitter pages stopped being updated with new products and offers. Any remaining Poundworld stores closed in early August. It's not clear whether any Bargain Buys stores remained trading this long as well, or were closed earlier in June or July.

Poundstretcher subsidiary (2018-present) 

Poundstretcher began to open stores under the Bargain Buys name towards the end of 2018, their first being in Paisley in September 2018. This was followed by 59 other stores across the UK. The Bargain Buys brand was purchased by New Money, a company established by Yorkshire-based property entrepreneur, Manni Hussain, who unsuccessfully attempted to trademark the Bargain Buys name in October 2018.

Poundstretcher filed a month later and successfully won the trademark with the phrase 'Bargain Buys, Big Brands Big Discounts'. 

In early 2019, Poundstretcher was successful in trademarking the Bargain Buys name. Throughout 2019, the company has since opened over 75 stores across nationwide using the Bargain Buys name, with plans of more to come throughout 2020.  

As of October 2019, Poundstretcher has opened over 75 Bargain Buys stores, many of which are opened in former Poundworld and Bargain Buys units.

References

Retail companies established in 2013
Companies based in Wakefield
Discount shops of the United Kingdom
British companies established in 2013